Totland Bay is a bay on the west coast of the Isle of Wight, England. It faces north west and has a  shoreline, which has a beach, concrete seawall, groynes and derelict  Victorian pier. It stretches from Warden Point in the north to Hatherwood Point in the south-west.

The seabed is a mixture of mud and sand, clear of many underwater outcrops, this makes it a popular anchorage point for vessels. The beach is predominantly shingle. Since 2001 the quality of the beach has been high enough for it to be awarded the Seaside Award Flag. In the summer, litter and seaweed are removed each day, with the latter being composted by local farmers. Currently, the pier is being refurbished to re-open the cafe which was there before.

The bay is best viewed from Headon Warren or anywhere along the concrete seawall. The Isle of Wight Coastal Path runs along the seawall from Warden Point to Widdick Chine.

Weston Academy, which closed in 2015 is located in the bay area.

References

External links
IOW Council information

Geology of the Isle of Wight
Bays of the Isle of Wight
Beaches of the Isle of Wight